Thomson Park may refer to:

Thomson Memorial Park, a park in Toronto, Ontario, Canada
Thomson Nature Park, a nature park in Singapore
Thomson Park (Fiji), a sports stadium in Fiji

See also
 Thompson Park (disambiguation)